Karan Soni (born January 8, 1989) is an Indian-American actor and comedian. Often appearing in comedic roles, he came to prominence for playing Dopinder in the films Deadpool (2016) and its sequel Deadpool 2 (2018).

Born in New Delhi, Soni moved to the United States to study business at the University of Southern California before pursuing an acting career. He made his feature film debut in Safety Not Guaranteed (2012), which was followed by lead appearances on the series Betas (2013) and Other Space (2015). Soni has also appeared in the films Ghostbusters (2016), Office Christmas Party (2016), and Pokémon Detective Pikachu (2019). On television, he has appeared as a series regular on Blunt Talk (2015–2016) and Miracle Workers (2019–present).

Early life
Soni is from New Delhi, where he attended an international school. He came to the United States at 18 years old to study at the University of Southern California.

Career
Soni made his film debut in Yusuf Sumer's 2010 comedy film Kaka Nirvana, alongside Rachel Quinn. In 2013, Soni was cast in the Amazon Studios original series Betas. The series was cancelled after one season. In 2014, Soni appeared in commercials for AT&T along with Jim Conroy.

In 2015, Soni appeared in Other Space, a series created by Paul Feig for Yahoo! Screen, as Captain Stewart Lipinski. Yahoo! Screen would be shut down later in the year, preventing the series from being renewed for a second season, while the first season would later be picked up by DUST in 2020. Later in 2015, he appeared in episodes of Melissa & Joey, The Goldbergs and 100 Things to Do Before High School and began starring in Blunt Talk, opposite Patrick Stewart, as Martin. The series was renewed for a second season, which premiered in 2016, but on December 20, was cancelled after two seasons.

In 2016, Soni appeared in Deadpool as a taxi driver named Dopinder and in Ghostbusters as the delivery man Benny. He reprised Dopinder in 2018's Deadpool 2 and also appeared in another May blockbuster film, the following year's Pokémon Detective Pikachu. In both Deadpool films and Pokémon Detective Pikachu, he starred opposite Ryan Reynolds.

in 2023, Soni was announced as the voice of Spider-Man India in Spider-Man: Across the Spider-Verse.

Personal life
Soni is gay. He is in a relationship with writer and director Roshan Sethi, with whom he developed the film 7 Days.

Filmography

Film

Television

Podcast

References

External links
 
 
 
 

1989 births
Living people
21st-century American male actors
21st-century Indian male actors
American gay actors
American male film actors
American male television actors
American male voice actors
American people of Indian descent
Indian emigrants to the United States
Indian male film actors
Indian male television actors
Indian male voice actors
Indian gay actors
Male actors from New Delhi
USC School of Dramatic Arts alumni